Benchmark is a venture capital firm founded in 1995 by Bob Kagle, Bruce Dunlevie, Andy Rachleff, Kevin Harvey, and Val Vaden. It is headquartered at 140 New Montgomery in San Francisco.

Investments
The firm's most successful investment was a 1997 investment of $6.7 million in eBay for 22.1% of the company. In 2011, it invested $12 million for an 11% stake in Uber, worth $7 billion in 2019.

Other notable companies funded by the firm include 1-800-Flowers, Amplitude,AOL, Art.com/Allposters.com, Asana, Baixing, CTERA Networks, Cerebras Systems, Confluent,  Cockroach Labs, CouchSurfing, Cyanogen, Digits, Discord, Duo Security, Domo, Inc., Docker, Dropbox, EBags.com, eBay, Friendster, HackerOne Instagram, JAMDAT, Juniper Networks, Marin Software, Metacafe, Minted, Modern Treasury, MySQL, New Relic, Nextdoor, OpenTable, Optimizely, Palm, Inc., ResearchGate, Seeking Alpha, ServiceSource, Sketch, Snapchat, Solv, Stitch Fix, Twitter, Tellme Networks, Uber, Ubiquity6, Vessel, WeWork, Xapo, Yelp, Inc., Zendesk, Zillow, Zipcar, and Zuora.

Partner structure
Benchmark is noted for creating the first equal ownership and compensation structure for its partners. The "maverick" firm differs from most VC firms, which are named for their founders and are structured hierarchically; Benchmark was described by Fortune as "a lean operation in which its six full-time partners share profits equally." There is no differentiation between its "junior partners" and "senior partners," as each partner benefits equally from company profits. In addition, there is no CEO-like position held.

In popular culture
Benchmark Capital was featured in the Apple TV+ Original WeCrashed starring Jared Leto and Anne Hathaway. In the show, Anthony Edwards portrays Benchmark co-founder Bruce Dunlevie, who on April 1, 2012, became WeWork's first major investor when it led WeWork's $17 million Series-A seed funding.

Benchmark was also featured in the Showtime Original Super Pumped starring Joseph Gordon-Levitt. In the series, Kyle Chandler plays Benchmark General Partner Bill Gurley, portraying his involvement in leading Ubers' $11 million round of fundraising in February of 2011.

See also
 Michael Eisenberg - Managing Partner and representative in Israel
 List of venture capital firms

References

External links
 

Companies based in Menlo Park, California
Financial services companies established in 1995
Venture capital firms of the United States